Kenny's Window is the first children's picturebook that was written and illustrated by Maurice Sendak. Originally published by Harper and Brothers Inc., it tells the story of a young boy's quest for a garden that he sees in his dream, which involves answering seven questions given to him by a four-legged rooster in that dream. His toys and stuffed animals help him along the way.

See also
Where the Wild Things Are
In the Night Kitchen
Outside Over There

References

External links

1956 children's books
American picture books
Picture books by Maurice Sendak
Harper & Brothers books
Books by Maurice Sendak
Debut books